Moss Point High School is a public high school in Moss Point, Mississippi, United States. It is part of the Moss Point School District.

History
Moss Point High School was established in 1883 in a two-story schoolhouse. Tuition was required. There was also a Moss Point Academy. William Cole served as principal in 1930 and shot game at Pascagoula Springs.

Magnolia High School served the area's African American students during segregation. W. H. Whisenton was its principal. Moss Point High School was white only.

A two-story art deco school building was constructed as part of a Works Project Administration (WPA) project in 1941.
 
Magnolia High School closed in the 1970s. Monarchs were the school mascot and the school colors were purple and gold. After desegregation Magnolia became a junior high school. There was a violent confrontation at Moss Point's high school and dozens of police responded.

Jesse Jackson was photographed during a visit to the school in 1999.

Academics
Moss Point was ranked 105th in Mississippi and 11,634th nationally in the 2021 U.S. News & World Report annual ranking of public high schools.

Demographics
The demographic breakdown of the 476 students enrolled for school year 2020-21 was:

Asian - 0.2%
Black - 78.6%
Hispanic - 4 2%
Male - 50.4%
Native Hawaiian/Pacific islanders - 0.2%
White - 14.5%
Multiracial - 2.3%
Female - 49.6%

For 2020-21, Moss Point was a Title I school with 100% of its students eligible for free lunch.

Athletics
The Moss Point Tigers colors are navy blue, grey and white. The school's football team has won several state championships.

Tom Swayze coached the football team in 1945 when it went undefeated with Ken Farragut playing.

Alumni
	
Damarius Bilbo
Devin Booker basketball player in the NBA
Melvin Booker
John F. Brock, corporate executive
Isaiah Canaan professional basketball player
Ken Farragut
Kenny Johnson (American football)
Robert Khayat, University of Mississippi Chancellor and former professional football player
Aubrey Matthews, football wide receiver
Toni Seawright
Tony Sipp

References

External links
 

Public high schools in Mississippi